James Harrison Coburn III (August 31, 1928 – November 18, 2002) was an American film and television actor who was featured in more than 70 films, largely action roles, and made 100 television appearances during a 45-year career.

Coburn was a capable, rough-hewn leading man, whose toothy grin and lanky physique made him a perfect tough guy in numerous leading and supporting roles in Westerns and action films, such as The Magnificent Seven, Hell Is for Heroes; The Great Escape; Charade, Our Man Flint, In Like Flint, The President's Analyst, Hard Times, Duck, You Sucker!, Pat Garrett and Billy the Kid, and Cross of Iron. In 1998, Coburn won an Academy Award for his supporting role as Glen Whitehouse in Affliction. In 2002, he received a Primetime Emmy Award for Outstanding Miniseries nomination for producing The Mists of Avalon.

During the New Hollywood era, he cultivated an image synonymous with "cool".

Early life
James Harrison Coburn III was born in Laurel, Nebraska, on August 31, 1928, the son of James Harrison Coburn II and Mylet S. Coburn (née Johnson). His father and namesake was of Scots-Irish ancestry and his mother was an immigrant from Sweden. His father had a garage business in Laurel that was destroyed by the Great Depression. Coburn was raised in Compton, California, where he attended Compton Junior College.

In 1950, Coburn was drafted in the United States Army, where he served as a truck driver and occasionally a disc jockey on an Army radio station in Texas. He also narrated Army training films in Mainz, West Germany. He attended Los Angeles City College, where he studied acting with fellow future actor Jeff Corey under Stella Adler’s tutelage, and later made his stage debut at the La Jolla Playhouse in Herman Melville's Billy Budd.

Early career

Television
Coburn's first television appearance was in 1953 on Four Star Playhouse.

He was selected for a Remington Products razor commercial, where he was able to shave off 11 days of beard growth in less than 60 seconds while joking that he had more teeth to show on camera than the other 12 candidates for the part.

Coburn's film debut came in 1959 as the sidekick of Pernell Roberts in the Randolph Scott Western Ride Lonesome. He soon got a job in another Western, Face of a Fugitive (1959).

He also appeared in dozens of television roles, including, with Roberts, several episodes of NBC's Bonanza. He appeared twice each on two other NBC Westerns: Tales of Wells Fargo with Dale Robertson, one episode in the role of Butch Cassidy; and The Restless Gun with John Payne in "The Pawn" and "The Way Back", the latter segment alongside Bonanza'''s Dan Blocker. "Butch Cassidy" aired in 1958.

Coburn's third film was a major breakthrough for him, as the knife-wielding Britt in The Magnificent Seven (1960), directed by John Sturges for the Mirisch Company. Coburn was hired on the recommendation of his friend Robert Vaughn.

During the 1960–61 season, Coburn co-starred with Ralph Taeger and Joi Lansing in the NBC adventure/drama series Klondike, set in the Alaskan gold rush town of Skagway.

When Klondike was cancelled, Taeger and Coburn were regrouped as detectives in Mexico in NBC's equally short-lived Acapulco.

Coburn also made two guest appearances on CBS's Perry Mason, both times as the murder victim, in "The Case of the Envious Editor" and "The Case of the Angry Astronaut". In 1962, he portrayed Col. Briscoe in the "Hostage Child" of CBS's Rawhide.

Supporting actor in films

Coburn had a good role in Hell Is for Heroes (1962), a war film with Steve McQueen. He followed it with another war film with McQueen, The Great Escape (1963), directed by Sturges for the Mirisches, where Coburn played an Australian POW. For the Mirisches, Coburn narrated Kings of the Sun (1963).

Coburn was one of the villains in Charade (1963), starring Cary Grant and Audrey Hepburn. He followed that role playing a glib naval officer in Paddy Chayefsky's The Americanization of Emily, replacing James Garner, who had moved up to the lead role when William Holden pulled out. This led to Coburn being signed to a seven-year contract with 20th Century Fox.

Coburn had another excellent supporting role as a one-armed Indian tracker in Major Dundee (1965), directed by Sam Peckinpah and starring Charlton Heston.

At Fox, he was second-billed in the pirate film A High Wind in Jamaica (1965), supporting Anthony Quinn in the lead role. He had a cameo in the black comedy The Loved One (1965).

Stardom
Coburn became a genuine star following the release of Fox's James Bond parody film Our Man Flint (1966), playing super agent Derek Flint. It was a solid success at the box office.

He followed it with What Did You Do in the War, Daddy? (1966), a wartime comedy from Blake Edwards, which was made for the Mirisches; Coburn was top billed. It was a commercial disappointment. Dead Heat on a Merry-Go-Round (1966) was a crime movie made at Columbia.

Back at Fox, Coburn made a second Flint film, In Like Flint (1967), which was popular, but Coburn did not wish to make any more movies in that series. He went over to Paramount for a Western comedy, Waterhole No. 3 (1967) and the political satire The President's Analyst (1967). Neither performed particularly well, but over the years, The President's Analyst has become a cult film. In 1967, Coburn was voted the 12th-biggest star in Hollywood.

Over at Columbia, Coburn was in a Swinging '60s heist film, Duffy (1968), which flopped. He was one of several stars who had cameos in Candy (1968), then played a hitman in Hard Contract (1969) for Fox, another flop.

Coburn tried a change of pace, an adaptation of a Tennessee Williams play, Last of the Mobile Hot Shots (1970) directed by Sidney Lumet, but the film was not popular.

In July 1970, Richard F Zanuck of Fox dropped the $300,000 option it had with Coburn.

In 1971, Coburn starred in the Zapata Western Duck, You Sucker!, with Rod Steiger and directed by Sergio Leone, as an Irish explosives expert and revolutionary who has fled to Mexico during the time of the Mexican Revolution in the early 20th century. In 1964, Coburn said he would do A Fistful of Dollars if they paid him $25,000, which was too expensive for the production's tiny budget. Duck You Sucker, also called A Fistful of Dynamite, was not as highly regarded as Leone's four previous Westerns, but was hugely popular in Europe, especially France.

Back in the US, he made another film with Blake Edwards, the thriller The Carey Treatment (1972). It was badly cut by MGM and was commercially unsuccessful. So, too, was The Honkers (1972), where Coburn played a rodeo rider.

Coburn went back to Italy to make another Western, A Reason to Live, a Reason to Die (1973), or Massacre at Fort Holman. He then reteamed with director Sam Peckinpah for the 1973 film Pat Garrett and Billy the Kid,  playing Pat Garrett. In 1973, he was voted the 23rd-most popular star in Hollywood.

In 1973, Coburn was among the featured celebrities dressed in prison gear on the cover of the album Band on the Run made by Paul McCartney and his band Wings. Coburn was one of the pallbearers at the funeral of Bruce Lee along with Steve McQueen, Bruce's brother, Robert Lee, Peter Chin, Danny Inosanto, and Taky Kimura. Coburn gave a speech: "Farewell, Brother. It has been an honor to share this space in time with you. As a friend and a teacher, you have given to me, have brought my physical, spiritual, and psychological selves together. Thank you. May peace be with you."

Coburn was one of several stars in the popular The Last of Sheila (1973). He then starred in a series of thrillers: Harry in Your Pocket (1974) and The Internecine Project (1975). Neither was widely seen.

Later career
Coburn began to drop back down the credit list: he was third billed in writer-director Richard Brooks' film Bite the Bullet (1975)  behind Gene Hackman and Candice Bergen. He co-starred with Charles Bronson in Hard Times (1975), the directorial debut of Walter Hill, but it was very much Bronson's film. The movie was popular.

Coburn played the lead in the action film Sky Riders (1976), then played Charlton Heston's antagonist in The Last Hard Men (1976). He was one of the many stars in Midway (1976), then had the star role in Sam Peckinpah's Cross of Iron (1977) playing a German soldier. This critically acclaimed war epic performed poorly in the United States, but was a huge hit in Europe. Peckinpah and Coburn remained close friends until Peckinpah's death in 1984.

Coburn returned to television in 1978 to star in a three-part miniseries version of a Dashiell Hammett detective novel, The Dain Curse, tailoring his character to bear a physical resemblance to the author. During that same year as a spokesman for the Joseph Schlitz Brewing Company, he was paid $500,000 to promote its new product in television advertisements by saying only two words: "Schlitz. Light." In Japan, his masculine appearance was so appealing, he became an icon for its leading cigarette brand. He also supported himself in later years by exporting rare automobiles to Japan. He was deeply interested in Zen and Tibetan Buddhism, and collected sacred Buddhist artwork. He narrated a film about the 16th Karmapa called The Lion's Roar.

Coburn starred in Firepower (1979) with Sophia Loren, replacing Charles Bronson when the latter pulled out. He had a cameo in The Muppet Movie (1979) and had leading roles in Goldengirl (1980) and The Baltimore Bullet (1980). He was Shirley MacLaine's husband in Loving Couples (1980) and had the lead in a Canadian film, Crossover (1980).

Final years
In 1981, Coburn moved almost entirely into supporting roles, such as those of the villains in both High Risk (1981) and Looker (1981). He hosted a TV series of the horror-anthology type, Darkroom, in 1981 and 1982. According to Mr.T, Coburn was slated to play the Hannibal character on the hit television series The A-Team, but NBC changed their mind and went with George Peppard. He supported Walter Mondale's campaign in the 1984 presidential election. Coburn also portrayed Dwight Owen Barnes in the PC video game C.E.O., developed by Artdink as a spin-off of its A-Train series.

Because of his severe rheumatoid arthritis, Coburn appeared in very few films during the 1980s, despite continuing to work during his final years. This disease had left Coburn's body deformed and in pain. He told ABC News in a 1999 interview: "You start to turn to stone. See, my hand is twisted now because tendons have shortened." For 20 years, Coburn tried a host of both conventional and unconventional treatments, but none of them worked. "There was so much pain that...every time I stood up, I would break into a sweat," he recalled. Then, in 1996, Coburn tried methylsulfonylmethane (MSM), a sulfur compound available at most health food stores. The result, he said, was nothing short of miraculous. "You take this stuff and it starts right away," said Coburn. "Everyone I've given it to has had a positive response." Though the MSM did not cure Coburn's arthritis, it did relieve his pain, allowing him to move more freely and resume his career.

Coburn was in a four-year relationship with British singer-songwriter Lynsey de Paul from the late 1970s. They co-wrote her songs "Losin' the Blues for You" and "Melancholy Melon" that appeared on her album Tigers and Fireflies. Coburn resumed his film career in the 1990s, where he appeared in supporting roles in Young Guns II, Hudson Hawk, Sister Act 2: Back in the Habit, Maverick, Eraser, The Nutty Professor, Affliction, and Payback. His performance as Glen Whitehouse in Affliction earned him an Academy Award for Best Supporting Actor. He also provided the voice of Henry J. Waternoose III in the Pixar animated film Monsters, Inc..

Cars

Coburn's interest in fast cars began with his father's garage business and continued throughout his life, as he exported rare cars to Japan. Coburn was credited with having introduced Steve McQueen to Ferraris, and in the early 1960s, owned a Ferrari 250 GT Lusso and a Ferrari 250 GT Spyder California SWB. His Spyder was the 13th of just 56x built. Coburn imported the used car in 1964, shortly after completing The Great Escape.Cal Spyder #2377 was repainted several times during Coburn's ownership; it has been black, silver, and possibly red. He kept the car at his Beverly Hills-area home, where it was often serviced by Max Balchowsky, who also worked on the suspension and frame modifications on the Mustang GTs used in the filming of McQueen's Bullitt. Coburn sold the Spyder in 1987 after 24 years of ownership. The car was restored, had several owners, and was sold in 2008 for $10,894,400 to English broadcaster Chris Evans. At that time, it set a new world record for the highest price ever paid for an automobile at auction.

Over time, he also owned a Ferrari Daytona, at least one Ferrari 308, and a 1967 Ferrari 412P sports racer. From 1998 until his death, Coburn did the voiceovers for Chevrolet's Like a Rock commercials.

Personal life

Coburn was married twice. His first marriage was to Beverly Kelly, in 1959; they had two children together. The couple divorced in 1979 after 20 years of marriage.

He later married actress Paula Murad Coburn, on October 22, 1993, in Versailles, France; they remained married until Coburn's death in 2002. The couple set up a charitable organization, the James and Paula Coburn Foundation.

Coburn was a martial arts student and a friend of fellow actor Bruce Lee. Upon Lee's early death, Coburn was one of his pallbearers at the funeral on July 25, 1973.

Death
Coburn died from a heart attack at his home in Beverly Hills on November 18, 2002, at the age of 74. His wife, Paula, said that he died in her arms. Paula Coburn died from cancer less than two years later, on July 30, 2004, at the age of 48.

Critical analysis
In The New Biographical Dictionary of Film, critic David Thomson states that "Coburn is a modern rarity: an actor who projects lazy, humorous sexuality. He has made a variety of flawed, pleasurable films, the merits of which invariably depend on his laconic presence. Increasingly, he was the best thing in his movies, smiling privately, seeming to suggest that he was in contact with some profound source of amusement". Film critic Pauline Kael remarked on Coburn's unusual characteristics, stating that "he looked like the child of the liaison between Lt. Pinkerton and Madame Butterfly". George Hickenlooper, who directed Coburn in The Man from Elysian Fields'' called him "the masculine male". Andy García called him "the personification of class, the hippest of the hip", and Paul Schrader noted "he was of that 50s generation. He had that part hipster, part cool-cat aura about him. He was one of those kind of men who were formed by the Rat Pack kind of style."

Filmography

Film

Television

Video games

References

External links

 
 
 
 

1928 births
2002 deaths
American people of Scandinavian descent
20th-century American male actors
21st-century American male actors
American Jeet Kune Do practitioners
American male film actors
American male television actors
American male voice actors
American people of Scotch-Irish descent
American people of Swedish descent
Best Supporting Actor Academy Award winners
Burials at Westwood Village Memorial Park Cemetery
Los Angeles City College alumni
Male actors from Nebraska
Male Spaghetti Western actors
Male Western (genre) film actors
People from Cedar County, Nebraska
People from Compton, California
Male actors from Beverly Hills, California
Stella Adler Studio of Acting alumni
United States Army soldiers
UCLA Film School alumni